Henry Boyle may refer to:

Henry Boyle, 1st Baron Carleton (1669–1725), English, Irish and British MP, Chancellor of the Exchequer
Henry Boyle, 1st Earl of Shannon (1682–1764), Irish MP for Midleton, Kilmallock and Cork County
Henry Boyle, 3rd Earl of Shannon (1771–1842), Irish and British MP
Henry Boyle, 5th Earl of Shannon (1833–1890), British peer and diplomat
Henry Boyle (baseball) (1860–1932), American baseball player
Henry Edmund Gaskin Boyle (1875–1941), British anaesthetist, inventor of the Boyle's Machine
Henry G. Boyle (1824–1902), Mormon missionary

See also
Harry Boyle (disambiguation)